Hart Highlands Ski Hill is a small ski area in the Hart Highlands neighbourhood of Prince George, British Columbia, Canada. The area has two T-Bars, a rope tow, and features a ski school, rentals and night skiing with 11 machine-groomed runs, and is accessible by the city's bus system. The site is well known to cater for beginners, children, and freestyle skiers. The hill's hours are from 9:00am–9:30pm during week days, transitioning from day to night skiing. They also offer skiing from 9:00am–4:00pm on the weekends.

References

BC Communities website
Prince George page at worldweb.com
Skiing and Winter Sports in Northern BC page, britishcolumbia.com

Ski areas and resorts in British Columbia